John Talbott may refer to:

 John Talbott (mayor), former mayor of Spokane, Washington, USA
 John R. Talbott, American finance expert
 John H. Talbott, American actor and restaurateur

See also
 John Talbot (disambiguation)